The 2021 Scotties Tournament of Hearts, Canada's national women's curling championship, was held from February 19 to 28 at the Markin MacPhail Centre at Canada Olympic Park in Calgary, Alberta. The winning Kerri Einarson team represented Canada at the 2021 World Women's Curling Championship. The world championship was supposed to be held at the Curlinghalle Schaffhausen in Schaffhausen, Switzerland; however, the event was cancelled and rescheduled to the "Calgary bubble" of the Markin MacPhail Centre.

The event was originally scheduled to be held in Thunder Bay, Ontario. Due to the COVID-19 pandemic in Canada, it was announced that most Curling Canada championships still being held in the 2020–21 curling season would be moved to a centralized "bubble" (similar to that of the NHL as in Edmonton) at Canada Olympic Park. All events were held behind closed doors with no spectators permitted. In addition, due to COVID-19 restrictions and logistics, most provincial playdowns were cancelled, with teams being selected by their respective member associations.

Teams
Source:
{| border=1 cellpadding=5 cellspacing=0
!bgcolor="#FF0000" width="250"| 
!bgcolor="#0000CD" width="250"| 
!bgcolor="#0099FF" width="250"| British Columbia
|-
|Gimli CC, Gimli
Skip: Kerri Einarson
Third: Val Sweeting
Second: Shannon Birchard
Lead: Briane Meilleur
Alternate: Krysten Karwacki
|Saville SC, Edmonton
Skip: Laura Walker
Third: Kate Cameron
Second: Taylor McDonald
Lead: Rachelle Brown
Alternate: Dana Ferguson
|McArthur Island CC, Kamloops
Skip: Corryn Brown
Third: Erin Pincott
Second: Dezaray Hawes
Lead: Samantha Fisher
Alternate: Stephanie Jackson-Baier
|- border=1 cellpadding=5 cellspacing=0
!bgcolor="#FFFF99" width="250"| Manitoba
!bgcolor="#FFFF33" width="250"| New Brunswick
!bgcolor="#DC143C" width="250"| 
|-
|St. Vital CC, Winnipeg
Skip: Jennifer Jones
Third: Kaitlyn Lawes
Second: Jocelyn Peterman
Lead: Lisa Weagle
Alternate: Raunora Westcott
|Capital WC, Fredericton
Skip: Melissa Adams
Third: Jaclyn Tingley
Second: Nicole Arsenault Bishop
Lead: Kendra Lister
Alternate: Monique Massé
|St. John's CC, St. John's
Skip: Sarah Hill
Third: Beth Hamilton
Second: Lauren Barron
Lead: Adrienne Mercer
Alternate: Brooke Godsland|- border=1 cellpadding=5 cellspacing=0
!bgcolor="#228B22" width="250"| Northern Ontario
!bgcolor="#000080" width="250"| 
!bgcolor="#B22222" width="250"| 
|-
|Idylwylde G&CC, SudburySkip: Krysta Burns
Third: Megan Smith
Second: Sara Guy
Lead: Amanda Gates
Alternate: Kira Brunton|Mayflower CC, HalifaxSkip: Jill Brothers
Third: Erin Carmody
Second: Jenn Brine
Lead: Emma Logan
Alternate: Kim Kelly|Ottawa CC, OttawaSkip: Rachel Homan
Third: Emma Miskew
Second: Sarah Wilkes
Lead: Joanne Courtney
Alternate: Danielle Inglis|- border=1 cellpadding=5 cellspacing=0
!bgcolor="#006400" width="250"| 
!bgcolor="#00FFFF" width="250"| Quebec
!bgcolor="#32CD32" width="250"| Saskatchewan
|-
|Montague CC, Montague &  Cornwall CC, CornwallSkip: Suzanne Birt
Third: Marie Christianson
Second: Meaghan Hughes
Lead: Michelle McQuaid
Alternate: Kathy O'Rourke|CC Laval-sur-le-Lac, Laval &  Glenmore CC, Dollard-des-OrmeauxSkip: Laurie St-Georges
Third: Hailey Armstrong
Second: Emily Riley
Lead: Cynthia St-Georges
Alternate: Florence Boivin|Nutana CC, SaskatoonSkip: Sherry Anderson
Third: Nancy Martin
Second: Chaelynn Kitz
Lead: Breanne Knapp
Alternate: Amber Holland|- border=1 cellpadding=5 cellspacing=0
!bgcolor="#A9A9A9" width="250"| Northwest Territories
!bgcolor="#FFDD500" width="250"| Nunavut
!bgcolor="#800080" width="250"| 
|-
|Yellowknife CC, YellowknifeSkip: Kerry Galusha
Third: Jo-Ann Rizzo
Second: Margot Flemming
Lead: Shona Barbour
 |Iqaluit CC, IqaluitSkip: Lori Eddy
Third: Sadie Pinksen
Second: Alison Griffin
Lead: Kaitlin MacDonald
|Whitehorse CC, WhitehorseSkip: Laura Eby
Third: Lorna Spenner
Second: Tamar Vandenberghe
Lead: Laura Williamson
Alternate: Darlene Gammel|- border=1 cellpadding=5 cellspacing=0
!bgcolor="#FCCF51" width="250"| Wild Card #1 
!bgcolor="#001B69" width="250"| 
!bgcolor="#C9082A" width="250"| 
|-
|East St. Paul CC, East St. PaulSkip: Chelsea Carey
Third: Selena Njegovan
Second: Liz Fyfe
Lead: Kristin MacCuish
Alternate: Clancy Grandy|Altona CC, AltonaSkip: Mackenzie Zacharias
Third: Karlee Burgess
Second: Emily Zacharias
Lead: Lauren Lenentine
Alternate: Rachel Erickson|Assiniboine Memorial CC, WinnipegSkip: Beth Peterson
Third: Jenna Loder
Second: Katherine Doerksen
Lead: Brittany Tran
Alternate: Cathy Overton-Clapham|}

CTRS ranking

As of the 2019–20 season, where at least three out of four players remained on the same team for the 2020–21 season.

Wild card selection
In previous years, a wild card game was played between the top two teams on the Canadian Team Ranking System standings who did not win their provincial championship; the winner of this game was usually granted the final spot in the tournament. However, with many provinces cancelling their provincial championships due to the ongoing COVID-19 pandemic in Canada, thus not allowing many teams to compete for a chance to play at the Scotties, Curling Canada opted to include three wild card teams instead of the usual one. These teams directly qualified and did not participate in a play-in game.

For selection, teams must have 3 of 4 returning players from the previous season.

Round robin standingsFinal Round Robin StandingsRound robin results

All draw times are listed in Mountain Standard Time (UTC−07:00).

Draw 1Friday, February 19, 6:30 pmDraw 2Saturday, February 20, 8:30 amDraw 3Saturday, February 20, 1:30 pmThe Northwest Territories vs. Canada match was rescheduled to Monday, February 22, at 8:30 am, as Jo-Ann Rizzo of Team Northwest Territories was experiencing food poisoning symptoms. The three other games took place as regularly scheduled.

Draw 4Saturday, February 20, 6:30 pmDraw 5Sunday, February 21, 8:30 amDraw 6Sunday, February 21, 1:30 pmDraw 7Sunday, February 21, 6:30 pmDraw 8Monday, February 22, 1:30 pmDraw 9Monday, February 22, 6:30 pmDraw 10Tuesday, February 23, 8:30 amManitoba's win against Newfoundland and Labrador was Jennifer Jones's 153rd career Scotties win, surpassing Colleen Jones's previous record of 152 wins.

Draw 11Tuesday, February 23, 1:30 pmDraw 12Tuesday, February 23, 6:30 pmDraw 13Wednesday, February 24, 8:30 amDraw 14Wednesday, February 24, 1:30 pmDraw 15Wednesday, February 24, 6:30 pmDraw 16Thursday, February 25, 8:30 amDraw 17Thursday, February 25, 1:30 pmDraw 18Thursday, February 25, 6:30 pmChampionship pool standings
The top four teams from each pool advance to the championship pool. All wins and losses earned in the round robin will be carried forward into the championship pool. Wins in tiebreaker games are not carried forward.Final Championship Pool StandingsChampionship pool results

Draw 19Friday, February 26, 12:30 pmDraw 20Friday, February 26, 6:30 pmDraw 21Saturday, February 27, 12:30 pmDraw 22Saturday, February 27, 6:30 pmTiebreakerSunday, February 28, 8:00 amPlayoffs

SemifinalSunday, February 28, 12:30 pmFinalSunday, February 28, 6:30 pmStatistics
Top 5 player percentagesAfter Championship Pool; minimum 6 gamesAwards
The awards and all-star teams were as follows:
All-Star TeamsFirst TeamSkip:  Kerri Einarson, Team Canada
Third:  Val Sweeting, Team Canada
Second:  Shannon Birchard, Team Canada
Lead:  Lisa Weagle, ManitobaSecond Team''
Skip:  Rachel Homan, Ontario
Third:  Selena Njegovan, Wild Card #1
Second:  Jocelyn Peterman, Manitoba
Lead:  Joanne Courtney, Ontario

Marj Mitchell Sportsmanship Award
 Laurie St-Georges, Quebec

Joan Mead Builder Award
 Shannon Kleibrink, long-time committee member of the prestigious Autumn Gold Curling Classic Ladies Bonspiel in Calgary.

Final standings

Provincial and territorial playdowns
Due to the COVID-19 pandemic, many provincial playdowns were cancelled, with member associations electing to send their 2020 champions to the Scotties.

 Alberta Scotties Tournament of Hearts: Cancelled
 British Columbia Scotties Tournament of Hearts: Not held.
 Manitoba Scotties Tournament of Hearts: Not held.
 New Brunswick Scotties Tournament of Hearts: Cancelled. 
 The 2021 Newfoundland and Labrador Scotties Tournament of Hearts was held January 29–30 in St. John's. Team Sarah Hill defeated Team Mackenzie Mitchell three games to one in the best of five series. They were the only teams that entered.
 Northern Ontario Scotties Tournament of Hearts: Not held.
 The 2021 Northwest Territories Scotties Tournament of Hearts was held January 30–31 in Yellowknife. Team Kerry Galusha defeated Team Rogers 10–6 in the final to win the event. Three teams entered the championship and played a round robin which qualified two of them for the final.
 Nova Scotia Scotties Tournament of Hearts: Not held.
 Nunavut Scotties Tournament of Hearts: Not held.
 Ontario Scotties Tournament of Hearts: Not held.
 The 2021 Prince Edward Island Scotties Tournament of Hearts was held January 29–30 in O'Leary. Team Suzanne Birt defended their title as provincial champions by defeating Team Darlene London is a best of five series 3 games to 0. They were the only two rinks that entered the event.
 Quebec Scotties Tournament of Hearts: Not held.
 Saskatchewan Scotties Tournament of Hearts: Not held. Saskatchewan officials blocked a proposed bubble. To account for changes in teams between seasons, teams were selected based on both 2019–20 and 2020–21 season performance.
 The 2021 Yukon Scotties Tournament of Hearts was held January 15–17 in Whitehorse. Team Laura Eby defeated Team Patty Wallingham 3 games to 2 in a best of five series for the championship. They were the only two rinks to enter.

Notes

References

External links

2021 Scotties Tournament of Hearts
Scotties Tournament of Hearts
Curling in Alberta
Scotties Tournament of Hearts
Scotties Tournament of Hearts
Sport in Calgary